Rafael Lovato Jr. (born June 25, 1983) is a 4th degree black belt Brazilian Jiu-Jitsu practitioner (8x world medallist) and a retired mixed martial artist who last competed in the Middleweight division of Bellator MMA, where he is the former Bellator Middleweight World Champion. At the time of his retirement, Lovato Jr. was ranked the No. 4 Middleweight fighter in the world by Fight Matrix. In 2022 Lovato won the Brazilian Jiu-Jitsu European Championship for the second time.

Early life
Lovato was born in Cincinnati, Ohio, but his family moved to Oklahoma City, Oklahoma when he was eight years old. The son of a Jeet Kune Do instructor, Lovato studied a variety of martial arts in his youth and competed in amateur boxing before discovering Brazilian jiu-jitsu at age 13. He is of Spanish and Italian descent.

Brazilian Jiu-Jitsu career
Lovato was the second American, after B.J. Penn, to win the World Jiu Jitsu Championship as a black belt.

Lovato is a black belt under Carlos Machado, the oldest of the Machado family. Rafael has had a long and formative training history with Xande and Saulo Ribeiro, one which began after he competed against Saulo in the finals of the 2003 Arnold Classic, when Rafael was just 19 years old.

Since retiring from MMA due to medical issues, Lovato Jr. has made a return to competing in BJJ, starting out by unsuccessfully challenging Aaron 'Tex' Johnson for the Fight 2 Win Light-Heavyweight Masters Championship at F2W 151 on September 11, 2020. Lovato Jr. competed again shortly after at BJJ Stars 4 on November 14, 2020, where he was submitted with a crucifix choke by Dimitrious Souza. 

He also competed at the IBJJF Masters World Championships 2020, claiming silver in the absolute division after a close final match with Gregor Gracie. He returned to Fight 2 Win for F2W 166 on March 13, 2021 to compete against Gabriel Almeida in the main event, submitting him with a kimura.On April 30, 2021 Lovato Jr. headlined a Who's Number One event against Gilbert Burns, losing the match by unanimous decision.

Lovato Jr. returned to headline another Fight 2 Win event at F2W 177 on July 16, 2021, where he defeated Alexandro Ceconi by unanimous decision to win the promotion's Light-Heavyweight no gi title. He defended this belt at F2W 180 on August 6, 2021, defeating Gabriel Arges by unanimous decision. He then competed at Raw Grappling 1 on November 14, 2021 against Adam Wardzinski, defeating him by penalty points. In his final matches of 2021, Lovato Jr. represented Team LFA at UFC FightPass Invitational 1. Team LFA won the tournament, with Lovato Jr. submitting Mike Wilcox with a rear-naked choke and registering two draws against Jonathan Piersma and Travis Tooke.

Lovato Jr. had also verbally agreed to compete against the reigning ADCC World Champion Gordon Ryan at some point in 2021. After the match did not come to fruition, Lovato Jr won the 2022 IBJJF European Open and competed in that year's world championships, retiring from IBJJF competition on the mats after his final match. He competed at the ADCC World Championships in 2022 and finished fourth in the under 99kg division, announcing his retirement from that competition at the same time.

Lovato currently manages his own academy in Oklahoma City, Oklahoma.

Mixed martial arts career

Legacy Fighting Alliance
Lovato made his professional MMA debut on September 26, 2014 at LFA 35, against Canaan Grigsby. He won the fight by an arm-triangle choke at the end of the first round. His next fight came at LFA 46, against the future UFC middleweight contender Kevin Holland. Lovato Jr. won the fight by a rear naked choke, 84 seconds into the first round.

After these two victories, Lovato Jr. was scheduled to fight Marcelo Nunes at LFA 54, for the Middleweight title. Lovato Jr. won the fight by TKO near the end of the second round. He was scheduled to make his first title defense against Cortez Coleman at LFA 62. He submitted Coleman with an armbar in the last minute of the third round.

Bellator MMA
In March 2017, Lovato made his debut for Bellator MMA. He faced Charles Hackmann at Bellator 174 and won the fight via TKO just 13 seconds into the first round.

In his second Bellator bout, Lovato faced Mike Rhodes at Bellator 181 on July 14, 2017. Rafael Lovato Jr. won the fight via submission in the first round.

Lovato faced Chris Honeycutt at Bellator 189 on December 1, 2017 and Rafael Lovato Jr. won the fight by unanimous decision.

Lovato was expected to face John Salter at Bellator 198 on April 28, 2018. John Salter was later pulled from the event by the Illinois Athletic Commission due to an eye issue on April 24 and replaced by Gerald Harris. Rafael Lovato Jr. won the fight via armbar submission in the first round.

Lovato faced John Salter on September 21, 2018 at Bellator 205. Rafael Lovato Jr. won the fight via a submission.

Bellator MMA Middleweight World Champion
Lovato was scheduled to face Gegard Mousasi for the Bellator Middleweight World Championship. This bout was expected to serve as the co-headliner of Bellator 214. On December 20, 2018, it was reported that Mousasi pulled from the fight, citing a back injury and Lovato was pulled from the card. The bout against Mousasi was rescheduled to June 22, 2019 in London, England at Bellator 223. Lovato defeated Mousasi by majority decision.

On January 29, 2020, while appearing on the Joe Rogan Experience, Lovato revealed that he was dealing with a brain condition called cerebral cavernoma. He stated that the condition was nearly a reason for him to be pulled from his title bout with Gegard Mousasi, but he was ultimately given clearance. However, after further review on the potential risks of the condition weeks following the bout against Mousasi, commissions in Europe have stated they will not give Lovato clearance to fight in Europe any longer. Per the advice of his doctors, Lovato then said for the time being his MMA career is on hold, though he did not announce retirement and is hopeful he will fight again in the future. On February 10, 2020, it was announced that Lovato had relinquished the Bellator Middleweight title.

Lovato Jr has gone on record to state his desire to return to professional MMA for at least one more fight, and ideally in 2021. Although as yet, he's been unable to get medically cleared to fight.

Post Bellator 
Lovato made his return to MMA on December 28, 2022 at Inoki Bom-Ba-Ye x Ganryujima against undefeated Taiga Iwasaki. He won the bout in the first round, submitting, Iwasaki with a kimura. After the fight, Lovato Jr stopped short of announcing his retirement from MMA and announced that he was open to the possibility of more fights in the future.

Championships and accomplishments

Mixed martial arts
Bellator MMA
 Bellator Middleweight World Championship (One time)
Legacy Fighting Championship
Legacy FC Middleweight Championship (One time)
One successful title defense

Mixed martial arts record

|-
|Win
|align=center|11–0
|Taiga Iwasaki
|Submission (kimura)
|Inoki Bom-Ba-Ye x Ganryujima
|
|align=center|1
|align=center|2:10
|Sumida, Tokyo, Japan
|
|-
|Win
|align=center|10–0
| Gegard Mousasi
| Decision (majority)
|Bellator 223
|
|align=center|5
|align=center|5:00
|London, England
|
|-
| Win
| align=center| 9–0
| John Salter
| Submission (rear-naked choke)
| Bellator 205
| 
| align=center| 3
| align=center| 4:27
| Boise, Idaho, United States
|
|-
| Win
| align=center| 8–0
| Gerald Harris
| Submission (armbar)
| Bellator 198
| 
| align=center| 1
| align=center| 1:11
| Rosemont, Illinois, United States
|
|-
| Win
| align=center| 7–0
| Chris Honeycutt
| Decision (unanimous)
| Bellator 189
| 
| align=center| 3
| align=center| 5:00
| Thackerville, Oklahoma, United States
|
|-
| Win
| align=center| 6–0
| Mike Rhodes
| Submission (rear-naked choke)
| Bellator 181
| 
| align=center| 1
| align=center| 1:59
| Thackerville, Oklahoma, United States
| 
|-
| Win
| align=center| 5–0
| Charles Hackmann
| TKO (knees and punches)
| Bellator 174
| 
| align=center| 1
| align=center| 0:13
| Thackerville, Oklahoma, United States
| 
|-
| Win
| align=center| 4–0
| Cortez Coleman
| Submission (armbar)
| Legacy Fighting Championship 62
| 
| align=center| 3
| align=center| 4:04
| Oklahoma City, Oklahoma, United States
| 
|-
| Win
| align=center| 3–0
| Marcelo Nunes
| TKO (punches)
| Legacy Fighting Championship 54
| 
| align=center| 2
| align=center| 4:51
| Catoosa, Oklahoma, United States
| 
|-
| Win
| align=center| 2–0
| Kevin Holland
| Submission (rear naked choke)
| Legacy Fighting Championship 46
| 
| align=center| 1
| align=center| 1:24
| Allen, Texas, United States
| 
|-
| Win
| align=center| 1–0
| Canaan Grigsby
| Submission (arm-triangle choke)
| Legacy Fighting Championship 35
| 
| align=center| 1
| align=center| 4:07
| Tulsa, Oklahoma, United States
|

See also
 List of undefeated mixed martial artists

External links

References

1983 births
Living people
People awarded a black belt in Brazilian jiu-jitsu
American people of Italian descent
American people of Spanish descent
American practitioners of Brazilian jiu-jitsu
American Jeet Kune Do practitioners
American male mixed martial artists
Mixed martial artists utilizing Jeet Kune Do
Mixed martial artists utilizing boxing
Mixed martial artists utilizing Brazilian jiu-jitsu
Bellator MMA champions
World Brazilian Jiu-Jitsu Championship medalists
World No-Gi Brazilian Jiu-Jitsu Championship medalists
Brazilian jiu-jitsu practitioners who have competed in MMA (men)